Arthur William Ridley (11 September 1852 – 10 August 1916) was an English first-class cricketer. Ridley was a right-handed batsman who bowled right-arm underarm medium pace. He also played occasionally as a wicket-keeper.

Ridley was educated at Eton College, where he represented the college cricket team from 1870 to 1872, and at Christ Church, Oxford.

Ridley made his first-class debut for Oxford University in 1872 against the Marylebone Cricket Club. He represented the university in 18 first-class matches from 1872 to 1875, with his final match against Cambridge University at Lord's. In his 18 matches for the University Ridley scored 459 runs at a batting average of 18.36, with two half centuries and a highest score of 81 against the Gentlemen of England in 1874. With the ball Ridley took 63 wickets at a bowling average of 13.31, with three five wicket hauls and best figures of 6/80 against the Marylebone Cricket Club. In the field he took 23 catches for the university. Ridley captained the university in 1875. He was a cricket Blue in each of his four years in the university team.

In 1873 Ridley played his first match for the Gentlemen in the Gentlemen v Players match. Ridley would go on to play in 14 of the fixtures up to 1883. In his 14 matches he scored 491 runs at an average of 24.55, with three half-centuries and a single century, 103 in the 1876 fixture. With the ball Ridley took 19 wickets at an average of 27.63, with best figures of 4/41. Ridley took 14 catches for the Gentlemen in the field.

In 1875 Ridley made his debut for Hampshire against Sussex. Ridley played for Hampshire in 10 first-class matches, with his final first-class match against the Marylebone Cricket Club in 1878. In 10 appearances for Hampshire, Ridley scored 558 runs at an average of 29.36, with three half-centuries and a single century, 104 against Kent in 1876. With the ball he took 68 wickets at an average of 13.26, with ten five-wicket hauls, four ten-wicket hauls in a match and best figures of 7/46 against Derbyshire in 1877. In the field he took 4 catches for the county.

Ridley also made his debut for the Marylebone Cricket Club against Nottinghamshire at Lord's. Ridley played 14 first-class matches for MCC, with his final appearance in 1882 against Cambridge University. In his 14 MCC matches Ridley scored 329 runs at an average of 13.16, with a highest score of 47. With the ball he took 21 wickets at an average of 11.09, with three five-wicket hauls, a single ten-wicket haul in a match and best figures of 6/45 against Oxford University.

While playing for Hampshire, Ridley also represented Kent in a single first-class match against England in 1877.

In 1882 Ridley made his debut for Middlesex against Surrey. He played 16 first-class matches for the county from 1882 to 1885, with his final match against Yorkshire. In 16 matches for Middlesex, Ridley scored 527 runs at an average of 20.26, with two half centuries and a single century, 136 against Surrey in 1883. With the ball Ridley took 7 wickets at an average of 25.85, with best figures of 2-21.

As well as representing the above teams in first-class cricket, Ridley also represented the Gentlemen of England in 5 first-class matches, with a highest score of 105*. Ridley also played for AW Ridley's XI, England, Gentlemen of Marylebone Cricket Club, I Zingari, the Orleans Club, South of England and the Under 30s team in first-class matches.

In Ridley's overall first-class career he scored 3,150 runs at an average of 20.19, with 11 half-centuries, four centuries and a highest score of 136. With the ball he took 224 wickets at an impressive bowling average of 15.06, with 19 five-wicket hauls, four ten-wicket hauls in a match and best figures of 7/21. In the field Ridley took 79 catches and made 2 stumpings.

Ridley died suddenly at Westminster on 10 August 1916.

Family
Son of the Reverend Nicholas James Ridley (1821-1888), on 9 February 1882 in Kensington he married Adriana Elizabeth (1854-1910), known as Ada, the daughter of Francis Rodes Newton and his Danish wife Anna Louisa, daughter of Major Jacob Heitmann Gyllich, Knight of the Dannebrog. They had five children.

The eldest daughter, Vera Emily Ridley (1885-1966), married Bertram Francis Gurdon, 2nd Baron Cranworth in 1903 and the second daughter Marcia Emma Ridley (1889-1930) in 1911 married Philip John Sherwin Pearson Gregory.

Ridley's brother Alfred Ridley and son-in-law Philip Pearson-Gregory both played first-class cricket.

References

External links

1852 births
1916 deaths
People educated at Eton College
Alumni of Christ Church, Oxford
English cricketers
Gentlemen cricketers
Marylebone Cricket Club cricketers
Hampshire cricketers
Kent cricketers
North v South cricketers
Middlesex cricketers
Oxford University cricketers
I Zingari cricketers
Gentlemen of the South cricketers
Orleans Club cricketers
Gentlemen of England cricketers
A. W. Ridley's XI cricketers
Gentlemen of Marylebone Cricket Club cricketers
Over 30s v Under 30s cricketers
Non-international England cricketers
People from Highclere